Maya Mishalska (born Miroslawa Maja Miszalska Harasymowicz on December 8, 1971, in Warsaw, Poland) is a Polish-born Mexican actress, violinist and TV presenter.

Biography
She began playing the violin at the age of six. Through ten years of studies at the Music Conservatory, she looked for an opportunity to experiment in theatre. Her passion for acting surged after participating in a play by Federico Garcia Lorca.

A few years later, she arrived in Mexico City to begin acting studies. After enrolling in Televisa's Centro de Estudios Artisticos (CEA), her talent and beauty was noticed by producers. From that moment on, she has been busy appearing in various telenovelas, plays and films.

She speaks five languages: Polish, Spanish, French, English and a little Russian.

Filmography

Theater

Aladino, el musical
Pedro y el lobo (Sergei Prokofiev)
Un hogar sólido (Elena Garro)
La dama del alba (Alejandro Casona)
Bodas de Sangre (Federico García Lorca)
Blithe Spirit (Noël Coward)
Las tres hermanas (Anton Chekhov)
El retablo jovial (Alejandro Casona)
Honor (Joanna Murray-Smith)
Sueño De Una Noche Con Sabines - 2012 (Ignacio Lopez Tarso)
Tick, Tack...Boom - 2014 (Sabina Berman)

Awards and nominations

Premios TVyNovelas

References

External links

Maya Mishalska at the Yahoo
Maya Mishalska at the Blogspot
Biography of Maya Mishalska at the Esmas

1974 births
Living people
Mexican child actresses
Mexican telenovela actresses
Mexican television actresses
Mexican film actresses
Polish emigrants to Mexico
Naturalized citizens of Mexico
Mexican stage actresses
Mexican television presenters
20th-century Mexican actresses
21st-century Mexican actresses
Actresses from Warsaw
Mexican women television presenters